The Hugo Award for Best Fan Writer is the Hugo Award given each year for writers of works related to science fiction or fantasy which appeared in low- or non-paying publications such as semiprozines or fanzines or in generally available electronic media during the previous calendar year. There is no restriction that the writer is not also a professional author, and several such authors have won the award for their non-paying works. The award was first presented in 1967 and has been awarded annually.

During the 64 regular and retro nomination years, 110 writers have been nominated; 26 of these have won, including ties. David Langford has received the largest number of awards, with 21 wins out of 31 nominations. He was nominated every year from 1979 through 2009, and won 19 times in a row from 1989 through 2007. The other writers to win more than once are Richard E. Geis, with seven wins out of sixteen nominations; Mike Glyer, with four wins out of twenty-five nominations; Susan Wood Glicksohn, with three of eight; Harry Warner, Jr., with two out of nine; Wilson Tucker, with two out of nine; Bob Shaw, who won both times he was nominated; Forrest J Ackerman, with three out of five Retro Hugos; and Ray Bradbury, who won both Retro Hugos he was nominated for. The writers with the most nominations without winning are Evelyn C. Leeper, who was nominated twelve times in a row from 1990 through 2001, and Steven H Silver, whose twelve nominations span 2000-2013.

History
The Hugo Awards are presented every year by the World Science Fiction Society for the best science fiction or fantasy works and achievements of the previous year. The award is named after Hugo Gernsback, the founder of the pioneering science fiction magazine Amazing Stories, and was once officially known as the Science Fiction Achievement Award. The award has been described as "a fine showcase for speculative fiction" and "the best known literary award for science fiction writing". In addition to the regular Hugo awards, beginning in 1996 Retrospective Hugo Awards, or "Retro Hugos", have been available to be awarded for years 50, 75, or 100 years prior in which no awards were given. To date, Retro Hugo awards have been awarded for 1939, 1941, 1943—1946, 1951, and 1954, and the fan writer award has been given each time.

Hugo Award nominees and winners are chosen by supporting or attending members of the annual World Science Fiction Convention, or Worldcon, and the presentation evening constitutes its central event. The selection process is defined in the World Science Fiction Society Constitution as instant-runoff voting with six nominees, except in the case of a tie. The works on the ballot are the six most-nominated by members that year, with no limit on the number of works that can be nominated. Initial nominations are made by members in January through March, while voting on the ballot of six nominations is performed roughly in April through July, subject to change depending on when that year's Worldcon is held. Prior to 2017, the final ballot was five works; it was changed that year to six, with each initial nominator limited to five nominations. Worldcons are generally held near Labor Day, and in a different city around the world each year.

Winners and nominees 

In the following tables, the years correspond to the date of the ceremony. Writers are eligible based on their work of the previous calendar year. Entries with a blue background and an asterisk (*) next to the writer's name have won the award; those with a white background are the nominees on the short-list. In some years writers who received sufficient nominations to be listed on the ballot declined; these are marked as withdrawn in the entry and are not listed on the main Hugo Award site.

  *   Winners and joint winners

Retro Hugos 
Beginning with the 1996 Worldcon, the World Science Fiction Society created the concept of "Retro Hugos", in which the Hugo award could be retroactively awarded for 50, 75, or 100 years prior. Retro Hugos may only be awarded for years in which a Worldcon was hosted, but no awards were originally given. Retro Hugos have been awarded eight times, for 1939, 1941, 1943—1946, 1951, and 1954.

References

External links
The Hugo Awards official website

Fan Writer
Awards established in 1967
Science fiction fandom
Fantasy fandom